Manuel 'Manu' Barreiro Bustelo (born 8 July 1986) is a Spanish professional footballer who plays for CD Lugo as a forward.

Club career
Born in Santiago de Compostela, Galicia, Barreiro was a Valencia CF youth graduate. He made his debut as a senior with the reserves in the 2004–05 season, in the Tercera División.

After prolific lower league spells at CD Lalín and Algeciras CF, Barreiro joined Cádiz CF on 31 January 2008. Initially assigned to the B side, he made his first-team debut on 20 April 2008, coming on as a late substitute for Natalio in a 1–0 Segunda División away win against CD Numancia.

Barreiro scored his first professional goal on 18 May 2008, but in a 5–2 loss at RC Celta de Vigo. After the club's relegation to the Segunda División B, he was definitely promoted to the main squad.

Released by Cádiz in the summer of 2009, Barreiro subsequently represented Jerez Industrial CF, Zamora CF, CCD Cerceda, Pontevedra CF and Racing de Ferrol. With the latter, he scored a career-best 21 goals in two consecutive seasons, as his team achieved promotion to the third division and missed out another in the play-offs.

On 27 June 2014, Barreiro returned to division two after six years, signing for Deportivo Alavés. He scored 11 goals for the Basques in his debut campaign, including braces against CA Osasuna and CD Lugo, and added a further five in the following as they returned to La Liga after ten years.

After making no league appearances during the first half of the season, Barreiro terminated his contract on 22 December 2016 and joined second-tier club Gimnàstic de Tarragona just hours later. He was sent off for two bookable offences on his debut – a 1–1 home draw with CD Tenerife – the latter for not wearing the obligatory shinpads.

Barreiro signed a three-and-a-half-year deal with Lugo on 28 January 2019.

Honours
Cádiz
Segunda División B: 2008–09

Alavés
Segunda División: 2015–16

References

External links

1986 births
Living people
Spanish footballers
Footballers from Galicia (Spain)
Association football forwards
Segunda División players
Segunda División B players
Tercera División players
Valencia CF Mestalla footballers
Algeciras CF footballers
Cádiz CF B players
Cádiz CF players
Jerez Industrial CF players
Zamora CF footballers
Pontevedra CF footballers
Racing de Ferrol footballers
Deportivo Alavés players
Gimnàstic de Tarragona footballers
CD Lugo players